Admonio Vicente Gomes (born 10 November 1993), simply known as Admonio, is a Bissau-Guinean professional footballer who plays for Spanish club UCAM Murcia CF as a central defender.

Club career
Admonio was born in Bissau, but moved to La Mojonera, Almería, Andalusia at early age. A La Mojonera CF youth graduate, he made his first team debut on 9 September 2012, starting in a 0–0 Regional Preferente home draw against CD Viator.

Admonio scored his first senior goal on 28 October 2012, netting the opener in a 3–1 away defeat of Ciudad Las Marinas. On 18 November, he scored a brace in a 3–3 draw at Comarca Nascimneto.

In July 2013, Admonio moved to fellow fifth division side Berja CF. Roughly one year later, after being a regular starter, he moved to CD El Ejido in Tercera División.

On 4 July 2016, after achieving promotion to Segunda División B, Admonio renewed his contract for a further year. On 19 July of the following year, he signed for Linares Deportivo in the fourth division. 

On 3 July 2018, Admonio agreed to a contract with third division side Unionistas de Salamanca CF. He further extended his contract with the club on 22 August, being an undisputed starter.

On 9 January 2019, Admonio agreed to a deal with Segunda División side CD Numancia, effective as of 1 July. He only made his professional debut on 21 June of the following year, replacing Curro Sánchez late into a 0–2 away loss against CF Fuenlabrada.

On 28 September 2020, after suffering relegation, Admonio joined UCAM Murcia CF in the third division.

References

External links

1993 births
Living people
People from Bissau
Bissau-Guinean footballers
Association football defenders
Segunda División players
Segunda División B players
Tercera División players
Divisiones Regionales de Fútbol players
CD El Ejido players
Linares Deportivo footballers
Unionistas de Salamanca CF players
CD Numancia players
UCAM Murcia CF players
Bissau-Guinean expatriate footballers
Expatriate footballers in Spain